

Denmark
South Greenland – Carl Peter Holbøll, Inspector of South Greenland (1828–1856)

France
Martinique – Ange René Armand, Governor of Martinique (1836–1838)

Portugal
Angola – 
 Temporarily vacant (1836–1837)
 Manuel Bernardo Vidal, Governor-General of Angola (1837–1839)

United Kingdom
 Barbados and the Windward Island - Evan John Murray MacGregor, Governor (1836-1841)
 Malta Colony – Henry Bouverie, Governor of Malta (1836–1843)
New South Wales – Major-General Richard Bourke, Governor of New South Wales (1831–1837)
South Australia – Captain John Hindmarsh, Governor of South Australia (1836–1838)
Trinidad – Sir George Fitzgerald Hill, Governor of Trinidad (1833–1839)
 Western Australia – Captain James Stirling, Governor of Western Australia (1828–1839)

Colonial governors
Colonial governors
1837